Godfrey Obebo (born 1 April 1966) is a Nigerian former footballer who played in the English Football League for Halifax Town. He gained extensive experience on the non-League circuit in the Greater London area, and underwent several trials with professional clubs.

Club career
Obebo was born in Lagos. He emigrated to the United Kingdom in October 1986 and trialled with Port Vale. Further unsuccessful trials ensued, including with Birmingham City (March 1993), Bristol City (November 1993), and Cambridge United (August 1994).

In March 1993, Obebo joined Halifax Town, who were at the bottom of the Football League Third Division and in danger of losing their Football League membership after 72 years. He made three substitute appearances but was unable to prevent the club's relegation.

When Halifax's manager Mick Rathbone asked substitute Obebo to "warm up" during an away game at Doncaster Rovers, he misunderstood and went back to the changing rooms to sit beside a radiator.

In 1995–96 Obebo was playing for Grays Athletic. In March 1998 he was awaiting clearance to sign for League of Wales club Porthmadog, having also been attached to Kingstonian during that campaign.

In 2015 Obebo was serving as the assistant coach of Tower Hamlets FC. In 2022 he was a vice president of Clapton FC.

References

External links

1966 births
Living people
Nigerian footballers
Association football forwards
Halifax Town A.F.C. players
English Football League players
Sportspeople from Lagos
Expatriate footballers in England
Nigerian expatriate footballers
Nigerian expatriate sportspeople in England
Grays Athletic F.C. players